Country Falls is the debut album by the Finnish ambient pop band Husky Rescue. It was released on Catskills Records in October 2004 and re-released with a DVD in April 2005. The music by Finnish multi-instrumentalist Marko Nyberg and his band is country-influenced folk-pop with organic instrumentation and sparse samples, and features the vocals of Reeta-Leena Vestman (née Korhola).

Track listing 
All tracks by Husky Rescue

 "Sweet Little Kitten" – 4:45
 "Summertime Cowboy" – 4:06
 "New Light of Tomorrow" – 4:52
 "Sunset Drive" – 3:59
 "My World" – 4:50
 "City Lights" – 4:25
 "Gasoline Girl" – 4:13
 "Rainbow Flows" – 5:52
 "Sleep Tight Tiger" – 4:37
 "Mean Street" – 6:45
 "Good Man" – 7:52
 "Man Who Flew Away" – 1:33

Re-release DVD Bonus 
 "New Light of Tomorrow [Music Video]"
 "Summertime Cowboy [Music Video]"
 "City Lights [Music Video]"

Singles 
 "Summertime Cowboy" (2004)
 "New Light Of Tomorrow" (2004)
 "Sleep Tight Tiger" (2004)
 "City Lights" (2004)

Personnel 
 Marko Nyberg – bass, music & Lyrics
 Reeta-Leena Korhola – vocals
 Anssi Sopanen – drums
 Abdissa "Mamba" Assefa – Bongos, Tambourine, Handclapping
 Blaise Barton – Mastering
 Miika Colliander – Guitar (Acoustic), Slide Guitar
 Jon Goodwillie – Executive Producer
 Janne Haavisto – Engineer
 Timo Kämäräinen – Guitar, Lap Steel Guitar
 Timo Lassy – Flute, Flute (Alto), Saxophone
 Jussi Lehtipuu – Strings
 Mikka Lommi – Video Director
 Teppo Mäkynen – Drums
 A. Mallassi – Executive Producer
 Khalid Mallassi – Executive Producer
 Marko Nyberg – Violin, Producer, Instrumentation
 Miikka Paatelainen – Guitar, Guitar (Electric), Lap Steel Guitar, Wah Wah Guitar
 Chris Parmenidis – Mastering
 Emma Pihkala – Strings
 Tommi Pylkko – Photography
 Ville Riippa – Organ, Guitar, Piano, Keyboards, Clavinet, Moog Synthesizer, Fender Rhodes
 Joonas Rippa – Drums
 Pete Riski – Video Director
 Lasse Sakara – Guitar (Acoustic)
 Kustaa Saki – Art Direction, Design
 Emma Salokoski – Vocals
 Sam Shingler – Guitar, Vocals
 Mikko Siren – Drums
 Rauna Sirola – Strings
 James Spectrum – Engineer
 Arttu Takalo – Vibraphone
 Heikki Tikka – Drums

External links 
 Husky Rescue Official Site

References 

Husky Rescue albums
2004 debut albums